Clate Mask is an entrepreneur and co-founder and CEO of Keap, which makes small business sales and marketing automation software. Mask co-authored Conquer the Chaos, a New York Times best-selling book. Mask has made contributions writing about entrepreneurship for VentureBeat, Entrepreneur and Fast Company.

Education

Mask attended Arizona State University, where he received a Bachelor of Arts in Economics in 1996. He then continued to earn a Juris Doctor and Master of Business Administration from Brigham Young University in 2000.

Career

Mask started his career working for North Sky, a company in Utah that was later sold to About.com in 1999. In 2001, he started eNovaSys with Scott Martineau and Eric Martineau. eNovaSys evolved into what is now Keap where Mask serves as CEO.

Publications

Mask and Scott Martineau's book, Conquer the Chaos: How to Grow a Successful Small Business Without Going Crazy, was on the best-selling lists in The New York Times, USA Today, and The Wall Street Journal in June 2010. Conquer the Chaos focuses on balancing personal and work life, while becoming successful, as a budding entrepreneur.

Personal life
Mask and his wife, Charisse, are the parents of six children and reside in Gilbert, Arizona.

Further reading
Your Small Business Is Finally Taking Off.. And It's Terrifying
Passion, Freedom and Impact: The 3 Ingredients of Business Success

References

External links
EntreLeadership with Clate Mask
Clate Mask Interview

Arizona State University alumni
Living people
American chief executives
J. Reuben Clark Law School alumni
Marriott School of Management alumni
Year of birth missing (living people)